Andrew Marion Lenow Dietsche (born November 9, 1953) is an American prelate who is the 16th and current Bishop of New York in the Episcopal Church.

Biography 
Prior to his ordination, Dietsche was a freelance graphic designer and cartoonist – and he continues to this day to produce award-winning cartoons for the Episcopal New Yorker. After studies at Seabury-Western Theological Seminary, Dietsche was ordained to the priesthood in 1987. From 1987 to 1990 he served at Christ Church in Winnetka, Illinois, and from 1990 till 2001 as the rector of the Church of the Good Shepherd in West Springfield, Massachusetts.

From 2001 until his election as a bishop, he served as Canon for Pastoral Care in the diocese, being responsible for the pastoral care of the clergy and their families. He was elected bishop coadjutor by clergy and lay representatives of diocese at a special diocesan convention held at the Cathedral Church of Saint John the Divine on November 19, 2011.

Dietsche was consecrated at the cathedral on March 10, 2012, and formally installed as the 16th Bishop of New York on February 2, 2013.

He was appointed Officer of the Order of St John (OStJ), in September 2017.

See also
 List of Episcopal bishops of the United States
 List of bishops of the Episcopal Church in the United States of America

References

External links 
Episcopal Diocese of New York website
Bishop Andrew M. L. Dietsche

1953 births
Living people
General Theological Seminary alumni
Seabury-Western Theological Seminary alumni
Place of birth missing (living people)
Episcopal bishops of New York